Sir Neville Bruce Alfred Bosworth  (18 April 1918 – 25 December 2012) was a British Conservative politician. He served as leader of Birmingham City Council from 1976 to 1980 and 1982 to 1984, Lord Mayor of the city from 1969 to 1970, and director of Birmingham City FC.

Early life
Bosworth was born on 18 April 1918 in Birmingham, England. He was educated at the private King Edward's School, Birmingham He went on to study law at the University of Birmingham, graduating with a Bachelor of Laws (LLB) degree.

Political career
Bosworth was elected as a councillor for Erdington in 1950. He served as a councillor for 46 years.

Personal life
In 1945, Bosworth married Charlotte Marian Davis. Together they had a son and two daughters; Simon, Jane and Jo. His wife died in 2003.

Honours
In the 1987 Queen's Birthday Honours, it was announced that Bosworth was to become a Knight Bachelor "for political and public service". He was knighted by Queen Elizabeth II on 22 July 1987 at Buckingham Palace.

References

1918 births
2012 deaths
Conservative Party (UK) councillors
Commanders of the Order of the British Empire
Knights Bachelor
Lord Mayors of Birmingham, West Midlands
People educated at King Edward's School, Birmingham
Politicians awarded knighthoods
English solicitors
Alumni of the University of Birmingham
Birmingham City F.C. directors and chairmen
Leaders of local authorities of England
20th-century English lawyers